Samuel Leroux (born 27 November 1994) is a French professional racing cyclist, who currently rides for UCI Continental team .

Major results

Road

2012
 9th Grand Prix Bati-Metallo
2015
 4th Paris–Mantes-en-Yvelines
2016
 5th Time trial, National Under-23 Road Championships
2017
 1st Trio Normand (with Romain Bacon & Kévin Lalouette)
 9th Paris–Mantes-en-Yvelines
2019
 3rd Grand Prix de la ville de Nogent-sur-Oise
2020
 1st Paris–Connerré
2021
 10th Eurométropole Tour
 10th Grand Prix de la ville de Pérenchies
2022
 1st  Overall Tour d'Eure-et-Loir
1st Stage 3
 4th Grand Prix de la Ville de Lillers
 8th Grand Prix de Denain

MTB
2019
 1st  National Beach Race Championships
2021
 1st  European Beach Race Championships
 1st  National Beach Race Championships

References

External links
 

1994 births
Living people
French male cyclists
French mountain bikers
People from Boulogne-sur-Mer
Sportspeople from Pas-de-Calais
Cyclists from Hauts-de-France